The 2003 AMA Superbike Championship was the 29th season of the AMA Superbike Championship.

Season calendar

AMA Superbike

Rider standings

References

AMA Superbike Championship seasons
Ama Superbike
AMA Superbike Championship